Oleg Vladimirovich Gusev (born 24 April 1996) is a Russian canoeist. He competed in the men's K-1 200 metres event at the 2020 Summer Olympics.

References

External links
 

1996 births
Living people
Russian male canoeists
Sportspeople from Ryazan
Olympic canoeists of Russia
Canoeists at the 2020 Summer Olympics
Canoeists at the 2019 European Games
European Games medalists in canoeing
European Games gold medalists for Russia
21st-century Russian people